Saloba is a commune in the Cercle of Macina in the Ségou Region of Mali. The commune covers an area of about 647 square kilometers and contains 42 villages. In then 2009 census the commune had a population of 35,328.  The administrative center of the commune is the village of Sarro.

References

External links
.

Communes of Ségou Region